Guam Premier Outlets or GPO (formerly known as Guam Shopping Center and Guam Premium Outlets) (Japanese:グアムプレミアアウトレット) (Korean: 괌 프리미어 아울렛) (Russian: Премьер-министр Гуама), located along GH-14, is an enclosed outlet mall located in Tamuning, Guam. GPO is the only outlet mall in the United States territory of Guam with Ross Dress for Less being the only anchor of the mall. 

Located just north of the island's busiest intersection of Marine Corps Drive (Route 1) and Chalan San Antonio (Route 14), stores at GPO include Calvin Klein, GUESS?, Levi's, Tommy Hilfiger, Nike, Skechers, Famous Footwear and ABC Stores. Notable restaurants inside the mall include KFC, Cinnabon, Häagen-Dazs, Cold Stone Creamery, Panda Express (with Tea Bar), Subway, Charleys Philly Steaks, Taco Bell, and Chatime. Stand-alone restaurants include Ruby Tuesday, Wendy's, Longhorn Steakhouse, Applebee's, and King's. Other places on the outskirts of the mall include Chuck E. Cheese, and a Regal Multiplex.

GPO is served by Guam's private tourist bus systems and public transit buses. Tumon Sands Plaza

Places on the outskirts of the mall
Chuck E. Cheese
Regal Multiplex
Cost-U-Less
Wendy’s 
Applebee’s 
Ruby Tuesday 
Longhorn Steakhouse 
King's 
Cold Stone Creamery
Cold Stone Yogurt Bar

References

External links
Official website of Guam Premier Outlets

Shopping malls in Guam
Outlet malls in the United States
Tamuning, Guam